Nudaria discipuncta is a moth of the subfamily Arctiinae first described by George Hampson in 1898. It is found in Bhutan and Assam, India.

References

Nudariina